Paisa Yeh Paisa is a 1985 Indian Hindi-language film directed by Sohanlal Kanwar and produced by Ashok Khanna. It stars Jackie Shroff and Meenakshi Seshadri in lead roles.

Cast
 Nutan as Laxmi
 Jackie Shroff as Shyam
 Meenakshi Seshadri as Sapna
 Deven Verma as Sukhiram
 Bindu as Shanti
 Gulshan Grover as Guddu
 Amrish Puri as Jugal
 Om Shivpuri as Seth Chunilal
 Satyendra Kapoor as Professor

Soundtrack
M. G. Hashmat wrote all songs.

External links

1980s Hindi-language films
1985 films
Films scored by Usha Khanna